The 1955 Spanish motorcycle Grand Prix was the first round of the 1955 Grand Prix motorcycle racing season. It took place on 1 May 1955 at the Montjuïc circuit.

500 cc classification

125 cc classification

Sidecar classification

References

Spanish motorcycle Grand Prix
Spain
Motorcycle Grand Prix